High School Story was a mobile device video game developed and published by Pixelberry Studios in September 2013. It was available on iPhone and iPod formats, and it could be purchased through the App Store or the Google Store on Android. The game served as a sister story to Surviving High School, as some recognizable characters from the latter (Autumn, Wes, Owen, Kimi) are either included into or simply make appearances in the former. On June 4, 2018, Pixelberry Studios announced that it would be ending support for the game in the following weeks.

On July 15, 2022, Pixelberry Studios announced that High School Story will have its servers permanently shut down on August 10, 2022.

Gameplay

High School Story was a choice-based simulation game. The player is a student attempting to build their own high school, with no given name. In order to build up the school, the player must complete quests to progress through the story, obtain Classmates (who are categorized by their cliques), Hangouts (where Students can 'hang out'), and Land Plots (to put Hangouts and other various Decorations). The player is able to not only customize their appearance, but also the appearances of all other students in the school, excluding main characters created by the game (Autumn, Payton, Julian, etc.). In order to get Hangouts and Land Plots, the player needs to acquire Coins and Rings. The player receives coins and rings from finishing quests, though they can also purchase coins and rings with real money in the Store. Coins can also be collected from Hangouts, as each student produces a certain amount of coins per hour depending on their type and level. In the beginning of the game, the player is able to choose their gender and type, though they are only able to choose from three particular cliques: Nerd, Prep, or Jock. There are various types in High School Story which range from basic types such as a Jock, Nerd or Prep to "combined" classmates like Cheerleader, Gamer or Student Government, and the player can gain other students through two different methods: They can either buy students from Admissions using Coins or Rings, or they can try "Partying" to get the type of student they want. Partying is a game mechanic which allows players to gain special classmates without having to pay directly for them in Admissions. All parties take place in Party Central, which can be found in the Buildings tab for 1000 coins and is unlocked after a certain quest is completed. The player may only have one Party Central and therefore can only send two classmates to party at a time.

Plot
The game begins with the MC (Main Character) in an empty lot and is first introduced to the character Autumn Brooks. After a basic tutorial on the game, Autumn confides in the MC that she is miserable at a future rival school called Hearst High and wishes to attend the MC's school. They immediately receive a text from the main enemy, Max Warren, son of the principal of Hearst (or Kara Sinclair, head cheerleader, depending on the gender of the MC) and are threatened stating that unless their school contains fifteen students, it will be closed down.

After an introduction to Autumn's friend, Julian, the two characters try to convince him to transfer to the MC's school from Hearst due to him not being able to play because his coach benches him for Max. To their dismay, he turns them down because his being at the school is the only opportunity to be recognized by football scouts, as he is not entirely good in school or other activities. But when the MC and Autumn show up at a Hearst football game, Julian is banned from playing the game for the remaining season as a result of fighting Max.

Seeing the capability of the MC's school, Julian joins the school because he sees there is teamwork, a quality that Hearst now woefully lacks. To celebrate, they throw a party to get other students to come to their school with the help of Hearst student, Payton. The party is a success, but Payton forgets about throwing a party for Mia, Max's sister, and she and Kara swear to make her life awful in Hearst. Payton, feeling terrible, is convinced by Autumn to join the MC's school. She is initially sad because she is dumped by her boyfriend, but is happy again as she is able to date again.

Hearst challenges the MC and their school to a homecoming game. If they win, Autumn will be able to transfer to the MC's school. They are warned by an anonymous text messenger that Hearst has a plan to steal their playbook plans. Unfortunately, the text message comes to pass - Hearst uses a quadrocopter with a camera to view their plan and steal it. Julian manages to take it down in time but Max tells him that the footage has been streaming live and they have all that they need. They are able to create a new playbook, but as they practice it, Julian kicks the football to the direction of Payton's float and they have an argument with each other, leaving the MC to solve it. They work their differences out and Julian and the football team win the homecoming game.

Owing to the success of the homecoming game, Autumn finally gets to transfer to the MC's school. The MC is still curious about the quadrocopter that Max used to spy on them. Autumn tells her the only person who seems to know how to create one but to talk to him, the MC is required to go undercover. The MC is almost caught but barely escapes. Upon arrival, they meet Nishan, nerdy inventor and scientist. The MC tries to convince him to transfer schools but he declines stating that Hearst has a better academic program and a robotics club.

Main Characters 
 Your Character - Your Character is the main protagonist who is a main part in building the school. After being harassed by Max and Kara, Your Character dreams of making their new school a place where everyone is accepting of everyone. It is unknown what Your Character's life was like outside of school, but the player is allowed to make choices on what Your Character says to others, determining their personality. Your Character's looks and gender are customizable, and the player can also choose whether Your Character is a nerd, prep, or a jock.
 Autumn Brooks - Autumn is Your Character's best friend and is very loyal to the new school. Although her dad wouldn't allow her to switch schools in the beginning, the school beating Hearst High at football ultimately made him change his mind, and Autumn ended up attending the school. Autumn's mom, who Autumn was very close to, died three years prior to the game, when Autumn was only twelve. Autumn's father eventually remarries a woman named Charlotte. Autumn wasn't fond at the idea of a new step-mom at first, but after spending time with Charlotte, Autumn accepts her into the family. Autumn had her first kiss with Wes in the previous game, Surviving High School, and the pair still care for each other from time to time. It has been strongly hinted that Autumn harbors feelings for Julian and that he also has feelings for her too. It is up to the player to decide whether Autumn dates him or not. Autumn is an artist type.
 Payton - Payton is a cheerful girl who attends the new school after she forgets to throw a party for Mia, causing her to be a social outcast at Hearst High until Your Character invites her to the school. Payton is shown to love partying, shopping and peppermint lattes. Payton was revealed to be adopted and due to this, she once adopted a bunch of animals so that they could have a home like her. When she first transferred to the new school, she appeared to have a crush on Julian and was jealous of him and Autumn's relationship, but she moves on unless the player puts Payton and Julian in a relationship. Later, Payton is hinted to have a crush on Ezra. Payton is a prep type.
 Julian - Julian formerly was a student at Heart High until Autumn and Your Character convinced him to attend the new school. Julian decided to transfer because the football coach at Heart High would always put him on the bench and never let him play and he wanted somewhere where he would actually be given a fair chance. Julian has anger issues and has admitted that he used to be a bully when he was at Hearst High, but is now reformed. Julian has mentioned that his father would always tell him that he's only a "dumb jock" and that's sports is the only thing he'd ever be good at, hinting that Julian possibly has an abusive home life. Julian used to have trouble maintaining good grades due to the words of his father, but after receiving support from his friends, he was able to get good grades. Julian appears to be quite the heartthrob and has been crushed on by Payton, Kallie, and Autumn, however, it is only hinted that he returns feelings for Autumn. It is up to the player to decide who he actually dates. Julian has a younger sister named Hope who he always makes sure to defend. Julian is a jock type.
 Nishan - Nishan is a nerd type who eventually attends Your Character's school. At Hearst High, Nishan originally would do favors for Max, which prevented him from getting bullied. Nishan eventually realizes that he should be going to a school where people accept him for who he is and not for what he does for others. Nishan is best friends with Sakura and is hinted to have feelings for her, but it is up to the player on whether they get together. Nishan is shown to be very interested in science and robotics.
 Mia Warren - Mia originally attended Hearst High and is the sister of one of the football players there, Max. Mia was best friends with Kara at first, but ends up betraying her and Max by sending Your Character anonymous texts that reveal all of the pranks that Max and Kara were going to pull on the new school. When this is revealed, Mia plans on attending the new school despite her father's wishes. It is revealed that Mia's mother had remarried and Mia currently lives with her dad, who is implied to be very controlling and abusive. Mia formerly had an eating disorder before she attended the new school, but it developed again after taking her cheerleading photos for the yearbook and Julian absentmindedly called her "heavy". Mia ended up in the hospital for this and begins to see a psychotherapist to help her keep her eating disorder in control, even though she still struggles with it. Mia reveals later on that her controlling home life was a factor in her eating disorder because her food intake was the only thing she could control. Mia is revealed to like girls (although the player can pair her with boys too) and it is hinted that she has feelings for her best friend, Katherine. Mia is a cheerleader type.
 Wes - Wes is a sketchy character who originally attends Hearst High. Most people do not trust Wes, except for Autumn, who had shared a kiss with him in the former game, Surviving High School. Wes was being raised by his older brother, Matt, until Matt stole money from his boss to support him and Wes, which led to Matt being arrested. Wes visits his brother every week and plans on going to college for his brother. Wes is shown to always know everyone's secrets. Due to Wes's past, he is usually suspicious of everyone he meets and believes that everyone has a dark side. Koh is shown to be flirting with Wes occasionally, even kissing him once, and it is hinted that Wes and Sakura have feelings for each other sometimes. Wes is a slacker type.
 Sakura - Sakura is the best friend of Nishan. After Nishan leaves Hearst High without her, as well as a lot of unfinished projects they were working on together, Sakura is upset and doesn't talk to him for a long time. Your Character eventually helps them make up and Sakura transfers to Hearst High. It is strongly hinted that Nishan and Sakura have feelings for each other, and it is also hinted that she may have feelings for Wes as well, but the player chooses who she ends up with. Sakura is the gamer type and it is shown that gaming helps her heavily in real life, like finding games to help her with school subjects. Sakura is revealed to hate art because it is the only things that she can't use gaming to help her with. Sakura is shown to be very competitive towards others.
 Koh - Koh is a troublemaker who joins the new school because she ended up getting expelled from all of her other ones. It is revealed that her ex-boyfriend, Razor, has been trying to get her to quit school to join his company by doing things such as vandalizing, which is the reason why she's been getting expelled. Nishan and Sakura end up helping her by tricking him into hacking the school website, which was protected by an upgraded antivirus software that allowed them to hack into his computer and get all the evidence of his crimes and an antivirus from the file-deletion virus he created. Koh's mother left her when she was younger and she currently lives with her grandmother. Koh is shown to be very similar to Wes and flirts with him sometimes, even ending up kissing him once. Koh is a slacker type.
 Ezra - Ezra is a musician type who is also quite the ladies man. Ezra is revealed to have major trust issues after his ex-girlfriend, Lena, cheated on him with his ex-best friend, Jack Carver. Ezra eventually joins Your Character's school and starts a band with Your Character, Payton and Julian. Although Ezra flirts with just about every girl he meets, he appears to flirt with Payton the most, hinting that he has romantic feelings for her. 
 Katherine - Katherine originally attended Athena Academy, but eventually ended up joining the new school. Katherine is best friends with Brigette, Mia's cousin, but ended up kissing her boyfriend, Zero, while he was dating Brigette. Brigette never found out, but "Pandora" knew and used this to blackmail Katherine into attempting to lure Nishan and Sakura away from the school so that the school's chances of getting funds in the academic tests would be ruined. When "Pandora" was revealed to be Katherine's best friend, Lacey, Katherine begins to dislike Lacey and Lacey begins to pick on her daily, leading to Katherine switching to Your Character's school. Katherine is now best friends with Mia and it is hinted that Katherine likes girls, specifically Mia. Katherine is an emo type.
 Kallie - Kallie was homeschooled by her mother since she was a child, but ends up going to Your Character's school to attend the English class only. Kallie makes friends with some of her classmates, including Your Character, Payton and Julian, who encouraged her to enroll in the new school. Kallie is shown to be very good at vocabulary. Due to being homeschooled for so long, she has a harder time fitting in and making friends. Kallie has a sister named Melissa, but it appears to be a touchy subject for Kallie for unknown reasons. Kallie is introduced in the Extra Credit quests and is shown to have feelings for Julian. Julian doesn't notice her feelings and views her more as a little sister and is very protective over her. Kallie had a best friend named Connor when she was younger, but he moved away. He eventually visits her again and Julian is immediately protective over her, but soon realizes that Connor only has good intentions with Kallie and isn't a bad person. Kallie is a writer type.

Reception 
Google Play and the iOS App Store both gave it a 4.5 out of 5.

Termination of Support 
On June 4, 2018, Pixelberry Studios announced on the High School Story Facebook page that it would release the "finale" quest for High School Story on June 18, and that it would release a "final update in the following weeks."

On July 15, 2022, Pixelberry Studios announced via its blog that High School Story and its companion game Hollywood U will have its servers shut down permanently on August 10, 2022. Labelled as "The Final Sunset," both games will be removed from the App Store and Google Play Store.

Sequel 
A set of visual novels set in the High School Story world are included in Pixelberry Studios' app Choices. Split into three "Books" composed of fifteen chapters each, the story focuses on a new character created by the player who transfers to Berry High. Alongside original characters, Julian, Payton, Mia, Autumn, Koh, Sakura, Ezra, Nishan, Kara, Max and Wes appear in these Books, as does Hearst High as the rival school. In addition, five new characters are introduced as “Love Interests” for the main character: Emma, Caleb, Michael, Maria, and Aiden.

The series also spawned a reboot, High School Story: Class Act, that follows a new set of characters, with old and original characters making very rare appearances. Class Act ended at the beginning of 2020, bringing the entire High School Story saga to a close.

See also
 Surviving High School (mobile game)

References

External links
 

Android (operating system) games
High school-themed video games
Nexon franchises
IOS games
2013 video games
Simulation video games
Video games developed in the United States